The 2015 CIS football season began on August 30, 2015 with ten Ontario University Athletics teams playing that day. The season concluded on November 28 with the UBC Thunderbirds defeating the Montreal Carabins 26-23 in the 51st Vanier Cup championship at Telus Stadium in Quebec City. This year, 27 university teams in Canada played Canadian Interuniversity Sport football, the highest level of amateur Canadian football.

Regular season standings

Top 10 

Ranks in italics are teams not ranked in the top 10 poll but received votes.
NR = Not Ranked, received no votes.
Number in parentheses denotes number votes, after the dash number of first place votes.

Post-season awards

All-Canadian team 

 First team 
Offence
 QB – Andrew Buckley – Calgary
 RB – Dillon Campbell – Laurier
 RB – Mercer Timmis – Calgary
 IR – Mitch Hillis – Saskatchewan
 IR – Ian Stewart – Ottawa
 WR – Rashaun Simonise – Calgary
 WR – Daniel Vandervoort – McMaster
 C – Sean McEwen – Calgary
 G – Charles Vaillancourt – Laval
 G – Sean Jamieson – Western
 T – Braden Schram – Calgary
 T – Jason Lauzon-Séguin – Laval
Defence
 DT – David Onyemata – Manitoba
 DT – Samuel Narkaj – Concordia
 DE – Mathieu Betts – Laval
 DE – Jesse St. James – Acadia
 LB – John Rush – Guelph
 LB – Drew Morris – Acadia
 LB – Doctor Cassama – Calgary
 FS – Jesse McNair – Western
 HB – Robert Woodson – Calgary
 HB – Maïko Zepeda – Montreal
 CB – Godrey Onyeka – Laurier
 CB – Adam Laurensse – Calgary
Special teams
 P – Quinn van Gylswyk – British Columbia
 K – Johnny Mark – Calgary
 RET – Tunde Adeleke – Carleton
 Second team 
Offence
 QB – Will Finch – Western
 RB – Alex Taylor – Western
 RB – Ashton Dickson – St. Francis Xavier
 IR – Brian Jones – Acadia
 IR – Jimmy Ralph – Alberta
 WR – Yanic Lessard – Concordia
 WR – Jacob Scarfone – Guelph
 C – Matthew Van Praet – Western
 G – Darius Ciraco – Calgary
 G – Philippe Gagnon – Laval
 T – Eddie Meredith – Western
 T – Vernon Sainvil – St. Francis Xavier
Defence
 DT – Donovan Dale – British Columbia
 DT – Adam Melanson – Acadia
 DE – Kwaku Boateng – Laurier
 DE – Jonathan Boissonneault-Glaou – Montreal
 LB – Shayne Gauthier – Laval
 LB – Jake Heathcote – McMaster
 LB – Micah Teitz – Calgary
 FS – Kwame Adjei – Mount Allison
 HB – Nicholas Parisotto – Guelph
 HB – Mikaël Charland – Concordia
 CB – Alex Hovington – Laval
 CB – Devante Sampson – Mount Allison
Special teams
 P – Félix Ménard-Brière – Montreal
 K – Gabriel Ferraro – Guelph
 RET – Jamel Lyles – Manitoba

Championships 
The Vanier Cup is played between the champions of the Mitchell Bowl and the Uteck Bowl, the national semi-final games. In 2015, according to the rotating schedule, the Canada West Hardy Trophy championship team will visit the Atlantic conference's Loney Bowl championship team for the Uteck Bowl. The winners of the Québec conference Dunsmore Cup will visit the Yates Cup Ontario championship team for the Mitchell Bowl.

Playoff bracket 

The seed of the OUA Semi-Final is done so that the first-place team play the weakest team still alive.

Teams

References 

2015 Canadian Football League season by team
U Sports football seasons